Vicky Botwright (born 18 June 1977 in Manchester, United Kingdom) is a squash coach and former professional squash player from England. She reached a career-high world ranking of World No. 5 in 2005. In 2008, she finished runner-up at the World Open, losing in the final to Nicol David 11–5, 1–11, 6–11, 9–11. Botwright was a member of the England team which won the World Team Championships in 2006.

Botwright caused a controversy which gained considerable media attention in 2004, when she announced plans to appear on court at tournaments wearing in a bikini-style outfit consisting of a sports bra and thong briefs, and posed for photographs wearing the outfit. However the Women's International Squash Players Association (WISPA), refused to grant permission for her to play in the outfit. Her popularity and fame increased after the incident, though afterwards she stated that the whole idea of "skimpy" clothing on-court was a publicity stunt dreamed up by the members of WISPA. She went on to say that she was selected as the player to wear the clothing. She also said that this was not her idea at all, and that she did not think the incident would become so infamous.

Botwright now works as a squash coach having retired from the international tour in October 2008. She continues to make appearances as a player in Premier League Squash in England.

Vicky is the elder sister of Becky Botwright, who is also a squash player.

World Open

Finals: 1 (0 title, 1 runner-up)

Major World Series final appearances

Qatar Classic: 1 final (0 title, 1 runner-up)

Quotes
Botwright stated the following after she was defeated by Nicol David after the World Open in 2008.

See also
 Official Women's Squash World Ranking

References

External links
 
 Interview, April 2004
 Ms Botwright poses in the controversial outfit

1977 births
Living people
English female squash players
Commonwealth Games silver medallists for England
Commonwealth Games bronze medallists for England
Commonwealth Games medallists in squash
Squash players at the 2006 Commonwealth Games
Sportspeople from Manchester
Medallists at the 2006 Commonwealth Games